Romanus of Caesarea (also known as Romanus of Antioch) is venerated as a martyr. A deacon of Caesarea, he was martyred at Antioch.

Life
In 303 or 304, at the beginning of the Diocletianic Persecution, a deacon called Romanus, served in Caesarea in Palestine. He was living in Antioch where in the midst of the persecutions, he encouraged the Christians to stand firm.

During a pagan festival, he upbraided the participants for worshiping idols. Taken prisoner, he was condemned to death by fire, and was bound to the stake. When rain extinguished the flames, Romanus was brought before Emperor Galerius who was then in Antioch. At the emperor's command Romanus' tongue was cut out. Tortured in various ways in prison he was finally strangled.

Eusebius speaks of his martyrdom in De martyribus Palaestinae. Prudentius relates other details and gives Romanus a companion in martyrdom, a Christian by name Barulas. On this account several historians, among them Baronius, consider that there were two martyrs named Romanus at Antioch, though more likely there was but the one whom Eusebius mentions. Prudentius has introduced legendary features into his account, and his connection of the martyrdom of Barulas with that of Romanus is probably arbitrary.

The feast day of Saint Romanus is observed on 18 November. The church of San Román in Seville is dedicated to Romanus. Prudentius wrote a 1140 line hymn to Romanus, the Romane Christi fortis, the tenth hymn in his Peristephanon.

Barulas
Barulas (died 303) was a seven year old boy who was martyred along with Romanus of Caesarea by Emperor Galerius by being whipped and beheaded for their Christian beliefs. Barulas, like Quiricus, is venerated as a child-martyr. His feast day is on November 18.

Barulas was a child in the crowd of people who witnessed the torture of Romanus. Romanus told the Eparch Asclypiades that the boy was wiser than he was, because he knew the true God while the Eparch did not.

Asclypiades asked the boy what gods he worshiped, and he replied that he worshiped Christ. “Your gods are demons,” the child stated, “and they have not created anything.”

With these and other words, the young child put the idolaters to shame. Seeing that he could not convince Barulas to worship the false gods, he had the boy tortured. His mother stood by, encouraging him to remain faithful to his Saviour. After the child was executed, his mother took his body and buried it, rejoicing because he had shed his blood for Christ.

References

Sources
Martyr Romanus the Deacon of Caesarea and child-martyr Barulas of Antioch (303)

3rd-century births
303 deaths
Saints from the Holy Land
Syrian Christian saints
4th-century Christian martyrs
4th-century Romans
Christians martyred during the reign of Diocletian